The Kindaichi Case Files mystery novels are written by Seimaru Amagi, who also writes the stories for the manga series of the same title. The illustrator and co-author is Fumiya Satō. As of April 20, 2001, 9 volumes have been published in Japan by Kodansha. A portion of the anime television series episodes and the two animated films are based on the novels. All cases of Kindaichi featuring in the novels have been made into anime except for Heresy Mansion Murder Case, which is the final instalment of the novel series and the only instalment released after the conclusion of the anime television series. The 5th novel: Shanghai Mermaid Legend Murder Case, was also adapted into a live action movie.

The novel stories are somewhat connected with the stories in the original manga. For instance, Opera House, The New Murders in the novel series is a sequel to Opera House Murder Case in the manga series and Ghost Passenger Ship Murder Case in the novel series is a sequel to Lake Hiren Legend Murder case in the manga series. Some of the novels were translated to English and published in Japan. 


Volume list

English translation
 Kodansha International, Kodansha English Library
 The New Kindaichi Files (trans. Yuriko Tamaki, 1996) - Opera-za Kan Arata Naru Satsujin
 The New Kindaichi Files 2: Murder On-Line (trans. Yuriko Tamaki, 1998) - Dennō Sansō Satsujin Jiken
 The New Kindaichi Files 3: The Shanghai River Demon's Curse (trans. Yuriko Tamaki, 1998) - Shanhai Gyojin Densetsu Satsujin Jiken
 Kodansha International, Kodansha Ruby Books
 The New Kindaichi Files: Deadly Thunder (trans. Yuriko Tamaki, 1999) - Ikazuchi Matsuri Satsujin Jiken

See also
List of The Kindaichi Case Files chapters

References

Novels
Lists of light novels